Correios de Timor-Leste (CTL) is the government agency responsible for providing postal services in East Timor.

History
Correios de Timor-Leste became a member of the Universal Postal Union on 28 November 2003. The authority is also a member of International Association of Portuguese-Speaking Communications (AICEP) from 2002.

See also
Postage stamps and postal history of East Timor
Communications in East Timor

References

East Timor
Communications in East Timor
East Timor